Ailton Alves Lacerda Krenak (Vale do Rio Doce, Minas Gerais, 1954) is a Brazilian writer, journalist, philosopher and indigenous movement leader of Krenak ethnicity. He was forcibly separated from his people, of which only 130 individuals are left (down from 5,000 at the beginning of the 20th century), at age 9. When he was 17, he and his family migrated to the state of Paraná, where he was taught literacy and became a printing specialist and journalist. Krenak functioned as a representative of indigenous peoples at the debates on the 1988 Brazilian Constitution, where he covered himself in ritual face painting during a speech.

He either co-founded or participated in several indigenous rights organisations, such as the União dos Povos Indígenas (Union of Indigenous Peoples), the Aliança dos Povos da Floresta (Alliance of Forest-dwelling Peoples), the Núcleo de Cultura Indígena (Nucleus of Indigenous Culture), among others. In 2000, he appeared on TV Escola's documentary film Índios no Brasil (Indigenous Peoples in Brazil). From 2003 to 2010, Krenak was special aide for indigenous affairs to the governor of Minas Gerais. In 2016, he was awarded an honorary doctorate by the Federal University of Juiz de Fora, where he teaches about culture, history and traditional knowledge of indigenous peoples.

Writer
In later years, Krenak has been playing a distinguished role in public debate in Brazil. He has released three books as of August 2020: Ideias para adiar o fim do mundo (Ideas for Postponing the End of the World) (2019), O amanhã não está à venda (Tomorrow Is Not for Sale) (2020) and A vida não é útil (Life is Hardly Useful) (2020).

Philosopher
According to Krenak, human beings have dissociated themselves from the earth, which is being "devoured" by corporations that embody a European concept of humanity. This humanity is immured in artificial spaces and "excludes a variety of sub-humanities" which tend to latch onto the earth. He believes that the question whether there is a single humanity should remain open; however, Krenak does not feel like he is a member of this "select club". He believes COVID-19 discriminates against humans, due to the way human societies work. "It does not kill birds, bears, or any other beings, just humans", he says. That would be a consequence of how we came to think that the earth is a 'thing' and that we are distinct from it. "The type of zombie humanity we are invited to be a part of does not tolerate this much pleasure [of small constellations of people who dance, sing and make it rain], so much fruition of life. So, they preach the end of the world in the hopes of making us let go of our dreams." 'It is an absurd rationalisation of thought.'

He pleaded for the government of Jair Bolsonaro to be internationally condemned for failing to cut back on mining in indigenous territories in the Amazon as well as in other places in which 'the ecology plays a regulating role of planetary climate.'

As to permanent human agglomerations, Krenak states: "The idea that we can think about life based on cities has been called into question. I do not venture to say we will abandon cities. But I recognise an opportunity to re-evaluate our dependency on an old model of settlement...what we see is a host of neglected human beings, without ever being able to collect on that promise [of urban spaces that cater to a person's every need]" And, as regards the challenges posed by COVID-19: "The big investors, the billionaires, they're not the agents of change [rather, the new generations are]...whoever has sensibility doesn't have to be in a position of power to bring about change." He defines spirituality as the "interdependence between all things living".

References 

Living people
1954 births
Indigenous activists of the Americas
Brazilian journalists
Brazilian philosophers
Brazilian writers